"Your Love Is A Lie" is the second single by Canadian rock band Simple Plan from their third album Simple Plan.

Background
The song's chord progressions are similar to Green Day's "Boulevard of Broken Dreams" and Oasis' "Wonderwall".

Music video
The band flew to Los Angeles to shoot the music video on March 6. The video was directed/produced by Wayne Isham.

The video is a straightforward representation of the song. It intersperses shots of the band playing (later in the video, amid wind-blown blossoms) with shots of Pierre Bouvier's girlfriend, meeting (and having sex) with another man, while Bouvier, betrayed by the woman, waits in agony in his apartment. His apartment has a view of the man's apartment, with a clear view of a bedroom's window, where he sees them have sex.

Live performances
The song was performed at the closing ceremony of the 2010 Winter Olympics.

Track listing

Charts

Weekly charts

Year-end charts

References

2008 singles
2000s ballads
Simple Plan songs
Songs written by Pierre Bouvier
Songs written by Chuck Comeau
Songs written by Arnold Lanni
Song recordings produced by Danja (record producer)
Music videos directed by Wayne Isham
Rock ballads